Lavonne J. Adams is a published poet and writer living in Durham, North Carolina. Adams grew up in Norfolk, Virginia, but has called NC her home for over 30 years. Adams taught and was the MFA Coordinator in the Department of Creative Writing at the University of North Carolina Wilmington.

Education 
Adams has three degrees from UNCW. She earned her BA in 1986, followed by her MA in English in 1992. In 1999, she earned her MFA in poetry, making her one of the first to graduate from UNCW's Creative Writing graduate program. During her time there, Adams studied with visiting Writer-in-Residence Philip Levine, who was the United States Poet Laureate.

Publications 
Adams' poems have been published in over fifty venues, including Artful Dodge,The Southern Poetry Review, Missouri Review, and Poet Lore. Her first published collection, a 36-page chapbook entitled Everyday Still Life, consists mostly of poems written during her time in graduate school. Her next chapbook, In the Shadow of the Mountain, was published five years later. centering on the deadly 1902 eruption of Mount Pelée, it contains many historically-based poems written from the point of view of locals before, during, and after the eruption. Adams' most recently published collection is Through the Glorieta Pass. This book contains historical poetry about the Santa Fe Trail in the time when pioneers were settling the Wild West, drawing upon journals and other records of pioneer, Hispanic, and Native American women. Adams traveled to gather additional information in Santa Fe, NM, and along what remains of the trail.

Awards and recognition 
Adams was the recipient of the Persephone Poetry Prize for her chapbook Everyday Still Life, as well as the Randall Jarrell/Harperprints Chapbook Award for In the Shadow of the Mountain. Adams' poetry collection Through the Glorieta Pass won the 2007 Pearl Poetry Prize.

North Carolina Poet Laureate Kathryn Stripling Byer said the following about Through the Glorieta Pass:

Adams was awarded Artist-in-Residence at the Helene Wurlitzer Foundation Residency, Taos, NM Summer 2009. She was awarded a Fellowship from the Vermont Studio in 2009, and Artist-in-Residence, Harwood Museum of Art, University of New Mexico, Taos in 2007.

References 

American women poets
Living people
Writers from Norfolk, Virginia
University of North Carolina at Wilmington alumni
People from Wilmington, North Carolina
University of North Carolina at Wilmington faculty
Poets from Virginia
Poets from North Carolina
20th-century American poets
20th-century American women writers
21st-century American poets
21st-century American women writers
Year of birth missing (living people)
American women academics